George Richard Leggett (14 July 1879 – 28 April 1959) was an Australian rules footballer who played with Geelong in the Victorian Football League (VFL).

Notes

External links 

1879 births
1959 deaths
Australian rules footballers from Victoria (Australia)
Geelong Football Club players